"Cartoon Heroes" is a song by Danish-Norwegian dance-pop group Aqua from their second studio album, Aquarius. The song was sent to radio stations worldwide on 1 January 2000 and was released as a retail single on 31 January 2000. It was their first release anywhere for over 14 months due to the time spent touring the world, resting, and recording Aquarius.

Although a commercial success, "Cartoon Heroes" failed to follow the success of earlier songs such as "Barbie Girl" and "Doctor Jones". In Denmark, the song debuted at number one, selling enough copies to earn a quadruple-platinum sales certification within 48 hours of its release; it went on to become the country's highest-selling single of 2000. It also topped the charts of Italy, Norway, and Spain and reached the top 10 in at least nine other countries, including Belgium, Ireland, Sweden, and the United Kingdom.

Music video
The music video for this song was filmed in December 1999. It starts with an American newscaster reporting on broadcast that a one-eyed sea monster attacks the world prompting an SOS call for Aqua in space. The quartet wakes up in zero gravity and Søren pushes up the gravity lever. They put on their hero suits and prepare to drive their spaceship to planet Earth where the sea monster is deep in the ocean. The quartet then puts on their diving suits and they fight the sea monster they seek. The green slime that bursts out of the sea monster's defeat transmits to the ending where the triumphant quartet returns to the ship with Søren and Claus who's had their leg and arm injured and the ship goes to the surface.

The video directed by Czech movie director Tomáš Mašín is said to be one of the most expensive music videos ever made, reportedly costing $3.5 million to produce.

Track listings

European HDCD single, Canadian and Japanese CD single
 "Cartoon Heroes" (radio edit) – 3:38
 "Cartoon Heroes" (Love to Infinity classic radio mix) – 3:08

European maxi-HDCD single
 "Cartoon Heroes" (radio edit) – 3:38
 "Cartoon Heroes" (Metro's That's All Folks remix) – 6:22
 "Cartoon Heroes" (Hampenberg remix) – 5:41
 "Cartoon Heroes" (Junior's Playground mix) – 7:53
 "Cartoon Heroes" (E-Lite extended remix) – 9:09

UK CD1
 "Cartoon Heroes" (radio edit) – 3:45
 "Cartoon Heroes" (TNT mix) – 7:28
 "Cartoon Heroes" (Love to Infinity classic mix) – 6:28

UK CD2
 "Cartoon Heroes" (radio edit) – 3:38
 "Cartoon Heroes" (Sleaze Sisters Anthem mix) – 7:50
 "Cartoon Heroes" (Metro's That's All Folks radio edit) – 4:05
 "Cartoon Heroes" (video) – 5:05

UK cassette single
 "Cartoon Heroes" (radio edit) – 3:45
 "Cartoon Heroes" (Love to Infinity classic mix) – 6:28

Australian CD single
 "Cartoon Heroes" (radio edit) – 3:38
 "Cartoon Heroes" (Love to Infinity classic mix) – 6:28
 "Cartoon Heroes" (TNT mix) – 7:29
 "Cartoon Heroes" (video)
 "Cartoon Heroes" (behind the scenes video)

Charts

Weekly charts

Year-end charts

Certifications

Release history

References

2000 singles
2000 songs
Aqua (band) songs
Number-one singles in Denmark
Number-one singles in Italy
Number-one singles in Norway
Number-one singles in Spain
Songs about superheroes
Songs written by Claus Norreen
Songs written by Søren Rasted
Universal Records singles